David Andrew Jennings is an English composer (born Sheffield, Yorkshire, 30 May 1972). He read music at the University of Durham, studying composition with John Casken (a pupil of Witold Lutosławski) and again at Postgraduate level with Casken at the University of Manchester. Jennings has additionally benefited from regular consultations with Arthur Butterworth (a pupil of Ralph Vaughan Williams). Jennings' compositions employ a style that combines romanticism with more recent musical developments. In 2012, The Divine Art label released a recording of Jennings' Piano Music performed by James Willshire, which was nominated as one of Music Web International's Recordings of the Year 2013. Jennings has also composed orchestral, vocal and chamber music.

Recorded and published works

 Piano Sonata, Op. 1
 Three Sonatinas, Op. 2
 Prelude and Fugue, Op. 6 (Divine Art recording James Willshire)
 Three Lyrical Pieces, Op. 17
 Miniature Suite, Op. 18
 Harvest Moon Suite, Op. 19
 Melancholy. A Fragment., Op. 23

References

External links

Living people
1972 births
English composers
Alumni of University College, Durham
Alumni of the University of Manchester
People educated at Mount St Mary's College